is an athletic stadium in Hitachi, Ibaraki, Japan.

The stadium was constructed for the 1974 National Sports Festival of Japan, which was held in Ibaraki Prefecture, and was used for soccer events.

It was one of the home stadium of football club Mito Hollyhock in 2000.

References

External links

Football venues in Japan
Sports venues in Ibaraki Prefecture